Hubert Wathier August de Bèsche (7 July 1911 – 11 March 1997) was a Swedish foil and sabre fencer. He competed in three events at the 1936 Summer Olympics. He was also a diplomat and Foreign Service officer. He served as the Swedish Ambassador to the United States from 1964 to 1973 and to Denmark 1973 to 1977.

Awards and decorations
   Honorary Knight Commander of the Royal Victorian Order (June 1956)

References

External links
 

1911 births
1997 deaths
Ambassadors of Sweden to the United States
Ambassadors of Sweden to Denmark
Swedish male foil fencers
Swedish male sabre fencers
Olympic fencers of Sweden
Fencers at the 1936 Summer Olympics
People from Frösön
Sportspeople from Jämtland County
20th-century Swedish people